is a Japanese television action/drama series. Running from 1969 to 1976 over a total of 358 episodes, it was conceived in the spy fiction genre.

The show adapted over television specials, including  and

Cast 
 Tamaki Sawa: Sawamura Tamaki
 Bunjaku Han: Yumin Darowa
 Mako Midori: Ichijo Mako
 Reiko Oshida: Ota Reiko
 Masako Togawa: Amato Masako
 Yayoi Watanabe: Tanabe Yayoi
 Junko Miyazono: Miyano Junko
 Eiko Yanami: Mie Eiko (1973–74)
 Yuriko Hishimi: Hishida Yuriko (1973–74)

References

External links 
 

Japanese crime television series
Espionage television series
1960s Japanese television series
1970s Japanese television series
1969 Japanese television series debuts
1976 Japanese television series endings
TV Tokyo original programming
Japanese detective television drama series